This a family tree of the kings of Jerusalem. 

This diagram lists the rulers of the kingdom of Jerusalem, since the conquest of the city in 1099, during the First Crusade, to 1291, year of the fall of Acre.

See also
Crusade
Kings of Jerusalem
Kingdom of Jerusalem
Vassals of the Kingdom of Jerusalem
Officers of the Kingdom of Jerusalem
Haute Cour of Jerusalem
Assizes of Jerusalem
A 1911 map showing the Kingdom of Jerusalem and the other Crusader states.

References

External links

Family trees
 Tree
Dynasty genealogy